Herbert Butterfield (October 28, 1895 – May 2, 1957) was an actor best known for his work in American radio.

Career
Perhaps his major roles on radio were those of crime-lab expert Lee Jones (as well as many supporting characters) in  Dragnet, and The Commissioner in Dangerous Assignment.

Butterfield acted in dozens of roles on Broadway Is My Beat. His other roles in radio programs included: Rex Kramer on Dan Harding's Wife, Ziehm in Girl Alone, Clarence Wellman in The Halls of Ivy, Weissoul in Jack Armstrong, the All-American Boy, Preacher Jim in Kitty Keene, Inc., Judge Carter Colby in Lonely Women, Phineas Herringbone in Ma Perkins, Judge Glenn Hunter in One Man's Family, and Judge Colby in Today's Children. He also was the last actor to play Inspector Richard Queen in The Adventures of Ellery Queen on radio.

Butterfield's limited activity on television included reprising his roles of Clarence Wellman in The Halls of Ivy and The Commissioner in Dangerous Assignment. He appeared in many episodes of the TV version of Dragnet. He also had roles in a few movies, including The House on Telegraph Hill and Shield for Murder.

Filmography

References

External links 

1895 births
1957 deaths
20th-century American male actors
Actors from Providence, Rhode Island
American male film actors
American male radio actors
American male television actors